Bagle may refer to:

 Bagle (computer worm)
 The Bagles

See also
 Bagel (disambiguation)
 Baggle
 Beagle (disambiguation)